Unión Deportiva Ibiza is a Spanish professional football club based in the town of Ibiza, in the autonomous community of the Balearic Islands. Founded in 2015, it plays in Segunda División, holding home matches at Estadi Municipal de Can Misses, with a capacity of 6,000.

History
UD Ibiza was founded in 2015 with the aim of replacing the former UD Ibiza-Eivissa that played two seasons in Segunda División B. In June 2017, the club was promoted to Tercera División after spending two seasons in the Regional league.

On 7 August 2018, after the RFEF blocked Lorca FC's participation in Segunda División B, Ibiza paid the club's debts and achieved an administrative promotion to the third level.

In 2019–20, the club competed in the Copa del Rey for the first time. They defeated Pontevedra and Albacete before a 1–2 home loss to Barcelona in the round of 32, having led the league title holders with 20 minutes to play.

In 2020–21 Copa del Rey, UD Ibiza beat a Primera División team for the first time, winning 5–2 against Celta Vigo in the Second Round of the competition. Later, the team lost 1–2 to Athletic Bilbao in extra time.

On 23 May 2021, Ibiza was promoted for the first time ever to Segunda División by defeating UCAM Murcia CF in the final of the promotion play-off.

Season to season

2 seasons in Segunda División
3 seasons in Segunda División B
1 season in Tercera División
2 seasons in Categorías Regionales

Players

First team squad
.

Reserve team

Out on loan

Current technical staff

References

External links
Official website 
Estadios de España 
BDFutbol profile

UD Ibiza
Football clubs in the Balearic Islands
Sport in Ibiza
Association football clubs established in 2015
2015 establishments in Spain